Oenopota tenuicostata is a species of sea snail, a marine gastropod mollusk in the family Mangeliidae.

Description
The length of the shell varies from 5 mm to 13 mm.

This species resembles Curtitoma decussata (Couthouy, 1839) but is smaller and has more numerous ribs.

Distribution
This marine species occurs off Greenland and Novaya Zemlya at depths between 200 m and 2702 m.

References

 Sars, G.O. (1878). Bidrag til Kundskaben om Norges arktiske Fauna. I. Mollusca Regionis Arcticae Norvegiae. Oversigt over de i Norges arktiske Region Forekommende Bløddyr. Brøgger, Christiania. xiii + 466 pp., pls 1–34 & I-XVIII
 Gofas, S.; Le Renard, J.; Bouchet, P. (2001). Mollusca, in: Costello, M.J. et al. (Ed.) (2001). European register of marine species: a check-list of the marine species in Europe and a bibliography of guides to their identification. Collection Patrimoines Naturels, 50: pp. 180–213
 Sysoev A.V. (2014). Deep-sea fauna of European seas: An annotated species check-list of benthic invertebrates living deeper than 2000 m in the seas bordering Europe. Gastropoda. Invertebrate Zoology. Vol.11. No.1: 134–155

External links
 
 

tenuicostata
Gastropods described in 1878